Mackinlaya macrosciadea is a species of plant in the family Apiaceae, first described in 1860 by Ferdinand von Mueller as Panax macrosciadeus, and then transferred by him into the genus Mackinlaya in 1864. It goes by the common name blue umbrella.

The species is native to both the Northern Territory and Queensland.

References

External links
Mackinlaya macrosciadea images and occurrence data from GBIF
Mackinlaya macrosciadea (description and images)

Mackinlayoideae
Flora of Australia
Taxa named by Ferdinand von Mueller
Plants described in 1860